XEPP-AM/XHPP-FM is an AM/FM combo radio station serving the Mountains Region of Veracruz, Mexico, from studios in Orizaba.

History
XEPP-AM began on 1450 kHz and moved to 1190 kHz in the late 1980s. It was managed over the years by Grupo FM and Grupo ACIR, which ceded operation of the station to Grupo Radio Digital and then sold the station itself in 2016.

In 1994, this station gained a combo FM, XHPP-FM. This call sign was already in use in the state of Veracruz, on 93.5 FM in Pánuco.

References

External links

Radio stations in Veracruz